Michael Lavigne is an American author who wrote three books of fiction. His first novel, Not Me, published by Random House, was the recipient of the Sami Rohr Prize for Jewish Literature Choice Award for emerging Jewish writers, was an American Library Association Sophie Brodie Honor Book, a Book of the Month Club Alternate, and was translated into three languages. Lavigne's second novel, The Wanting, was published by Pantheon under the Schocken imprint early in 2013. In 2016, he published a third novel, The Heart of Henry Quantum, under the pseudonym "Pepper Harding".

Early life and education
Lavigne was born in Newark, New Jersey and spent part of his childhood in the suburb of Millburn-Short Hills. He was educated at the University of Tennessee, Millersville University in Pennsylvania, and the University of Chicago, where he received an M.A. in General Studies in the Humanities and is A.B.D. (all but dissertation) from the Committee on Social Thought.

Career
Lavigne began seriously writing fiction only at midlife, and was a participant of the Squaw Valley Community of Writers where he was discovered and mentored by the late Henry Carlisle. Before turning to fiction, he had a long career in advertising, with stints at Leo Burnett, Ogilvy and Mather, and his own agency in San Francisco, Freeman Lavigne Blanshei.

He directed commercials and short films including two for the PBS series, “Working,” and has been an instructor of writing for radio and television at the Academy of Art University in San Francisco.

Lavigne spent three years living and working in the former Soviet Union where he forged close connections to the refusenik and dissident communities. When he returned home, he joined the boards of both the Bay Area Council for Soviet Jews, and the Northern California Region of the Anti-Defamation League. He chaired the committee that created the new Tauber Jewish Studies Program at Congregation Emanu-El in San Francisco, which features an intensive curriculum for adult learners.

Honors and awards
His work has won numerous awards, including the Clio, New York Film Festival, Cannes, Communication Arts, the Effie and the Addy.

Personal life
He lives with his wife, Gayle, in San Francisco, and has two grown sons.

References

Living people
Writers from Newark, New Jersey
Millersville University of Pennsylvania alumni
American male writers
People from Millburn, New Jersey
American fiction writers
Jewish American writers
Year of birth missing (living people)
21st-century American Jews